"Never Turn Your Back on Mother Earth" is a song by the American rock group Sparks. The song was recorded by the group's mid-1970s glam line-up. It was released in late 1974 as the first single from the group's fourth album, Propaganda.

Plagiarism re-recording
In 1997, Sparks recorded a new version of the song with the producer Tony Visconti. This introduced strings and a choir. The song concludes their Plagiarism album where it segues from out of the previous track, "The Number One Song in Heaven".

Cover versions
Depeche Mode recorded a cover version on a single-sided flexi-disc which was sent to members of their official fan club for Christmas 1987.

Martin Gore, the guitarist and songwriter of Depeche Mode, recorded a cover version for his first solo EP, Counterfeit, in 1989.

Nicola Sirkis covered the song as the B-side to his 1992 single "Alice dans la Lune", from the album Dans La Lune.

Johan Johansson created a Swedish version titled "Kärlek & Respekt Till Moder Jord" for his 1994 EP 10.

Karen J. Walsha recorded a version for the Dutch tribute album Amateur Hour (A Global Tribute to Sparks) released in 1999.
 
Haloed Ghost recorded a version for their 2004 EP, Saw Versions.

Billy Mackenzie recorded a version which appeared on his 2005 album Transmission Impossible.

Paul Roland recorded a version which appeared on his 2005 album Strychnine... And Other Potent Poisons.

Geezerbird have recorded a version for their 2006 album One in the Hand.

Mary Hopkin recorded a version which appeared on her 2007 album Valentine.

Neko Case has a version on her 2009 album Middle Cyclone.

Louis Guidone made a version in 2011 on the self released album Meet Your Maker.

Satie's Faction recorded an instrumental version in 2012 for his album Déjà Vu.

Track listing
 "Never Turn Your Back on Mother Earth" — 2:28
 "Alabamy Right" — 2:11

Personnel
 Ron Mael - keyboards
 Russell Mael - vocals
 Trevor White - guitar
 Ian Hampton - bass guitar
 Norman "Dinky" Diamond - drums
 Adrian Fisher - guitar

Chart positions

References

External links

1974 singles
Songs written by Ron Mael
Sparks (band) songs
Song recordings produced by Tony Visconti
Song recordings produced by Muff Winwood
1974 songs
Island Records singles